Ruiz's frog may refer to:

 Ruiz's Cochran frog (Nymphargus ruizi), a frog in the family Centrolenidae endemic to Colombia
 Ruiz's robber frog (Strabomantis ruizi), a frog in the family Craugastoridae endemic to Colombia

Animal common name disambiguation pages